Furesø Kommune is a municipality (Danish: kommune) in Denmark. It has a population of 41,402 (1. January 2022) and a total area of 55.68 km² (21.50 sq.mi.) with water and forest making up around 10 and 15 km2, respectively. The municipality belongs to the Copenhagen Capital Region and lies 20 km northwest of Copenhagen. Its mayor is Ole Bondo Christensen, a member of the Social Democrats (Socialdemokraterne) political party. It is a municipality with much forest and access to several lakes, of which it is named after the largest, Furesøen, which has a popular beach with rest rooms, a small candy/ice shop and in addition sportsboat (competition) clubs and a restaurant open all year.

Værløse Air Base 

In September 2008, it was decided by the Ministry of the Environment that Flyvestation Værløse, a former air base - Denmark's first - situated 17 km from the City Hall square of Copenhagen and offered to the municipality to own, would be granted legally protected status from extensive real estate exploitation. This decision was appealed and The Environmental Board of Appeal (Natur- og Miljøklagenævnet) in 2009 overturned this decision. Before being given to the municipality to own, the Ministry of Defence sold some of the approximately 440 hectares of land to developers of private homes. Most of the former air base has since been made into an open air recreational area. A movie/media production company is located there. This offer (to own the former air base) was a consequence of the actions by the former mayor of Farum Municipality Peter Brixtofte, who was imprisoned in 2008.

Transport 
The last three stations, namely Hareskov, Værløse and the terminus Farum, of one S-train commuter train line from Copenhagen are located in the municipality. The terminus at the other end of this line is Høje Taastrup station. The light railway being built in the suburbs and inaugurated in 2025 runs between Lyngby-Taarbæk Municipality to the north and Ishøj Municipality to the south parallel to but outside the municipal border of Copenhagen Municipality but will not (for now) have a station (on another, parallel line) in Furesø municipality.

History 
It was established as a merger of the former municipalities of Farum in Frederiksborg County and Værløse in Copenhagen County on 1 January 2007 as a consequence of the Municipal Reform. The counties (Danish plural amtskommuner, singular amtskommune, literally county municipality) were abolished 1 January 2007 and replaced by regions, which are not municipalities.

Locations 

Population numbers as of 1 January 2021.

Politics

Municipal council
Furesø's municipal council consists of 21 members, elected every four years.

Below are the municipal councils elected since the Municipal Reform of 2007.

See also
 Listed buildings in Furesø Municipality

References 

 Municipal statistics: NetBorger Kommunefakta, delivered from KMD aka Kommunedata (Municipal Data)

External links 

 Official website of Furesø municipality
 Map
 Searchable/printable map of municipalities (Krak)(outline of municipality does not print out!)
 Printable map with outline of municipality (Krak)(outline of municipality does not print out!)

 
Municipalities in the Capital Region of Denmark
Municipalities of Denmark
Copenhagen metropolitan area
Populated places established in 2007